The Fun Ones is the seventh studio album by American musician RJD2. It was released on April 17, 2020, through RJ's Electrical Connections, with distribution via The Orchard. It features guest appearances from Aceyalone, Homeboy Sandman, Jordan Brown, Khari Mateen and STS.

PopMatters called it "possibly RJ's warmest, funkiest, and most laidback album, as well as a callback to his turntablist roots."

Track listing

References

External links 

 RJD2 – The Fun Ones at Bandcamp
 

2020 albums
RJD2 albums
Albums produced by RJD2